Electoral history of Ron Paul, Republican U.S. Representative from Texas (1976-1977, 1979-1985, 1997-2013), 1988 Libertarian Party Presidential nominee and candidate for the 2008 and 2012 Republican presidential nomination.

House and Senate races (1974-1984)
Texas's 22nd congressional district, 1974:
 Robert R. Casey (D) (inc.) – 47,783 (69.54%)
 Ron Paul (R) – 19,483 (28.35%)
 James T. Smith (American) – 847 (1.23%)
 Jill Fein (Socialist Workers) – 602 (0.88%)

Texas's 22nd congressional district, 1976 (special election):
 Robert Gammage (D) – 15,287 (42.07%)
 Ron Paul (R) – 14,386 (39.59%)
 John S. Brunson (D) – 3,670 (10.10%)
 Roy Ybarra (D) – 1,456 (4.01%)
 J. Charles Whitfield (I) – 776 (2.14%)
 Joe W. Jones (I) – 568 (1.56%)
 Erich J. Brann (I) – 197 (0.54%)

Texas's 22nd congressional district, 1976 (special election runoff):
 Ron Paul (R) – 39,041 (56.16%)
 Robert Gammage (D) – 30,483 (43.85%)

Texas's 22nd congressional district, 1976:
 Robert Gammage (D) – 96,535 (50.07%)
 Ron Paul (R) (inc.) – 96,267 (49.93%)

Texas's 22nd congressional district, 1978:
 Ron Paul (R) – 54,643 (50.56%)
 Robert Gammage (D) (inc.) – 53,443 (49.45%)

Texas's 22nd congressional district, 1980:
 Ron Paul (R) (inc.) – 106,797 (51.04%)
 Michael A. Andrews (D) – 101,094 (48.31%)
 Vaudie V. Nance (I) – 1,360 (0.65%)

Texas's 22nd congressional district, 1982:
 Ron Paul (R) (inc.) – 66,536 (100.00%)

Republican primary for the United States Senate from Texas, 1984:
 Phil Gramm – 246,716 (73.25%)
 Ron Paul – 55,431 (16.46%)
 Robert Mosbacher, Jr. – 26,279 (7.80%)
 Hank Grover – 8,388 (2.49%)

1988 presidential election
1987 Libertarian National Convention:
 Ron Paul – 196 (51.31%)
 Russell Means – 120 (31.41%)
 James A. Lewis – 49 (12.83%)
 None – 17 (4.45%)

1988 North Dakota Libertarian presidential primary:
 Ron Paul – 985 (100.00%)

1988 United States presidential election:
 George H. W. Bush/Dan Quayle (R) – 48,886,597 (53.4%) and 426 electoral votes (79.18%, 40 states carried)
 Michael Dukakis/Lloyd Bentsen (D) – 41,809,476 (45.6%) and 111 electoral votes (20.63%, 10 states and D.C. carried)
 Lloyd Bentsen/Michael Dukakis (D) – 1 electoral vote (0.19%, West Virginia faithless elector)
 Ron Paul/Andre Marrou (LBT) – 431,750 (0.5%)
 Lenora Fulani (New Alliance) – 217,221 (0.2%)
 Others – 249,642 (0.3%)

House races (from 1996)
Texas's 14th congressional district, 1996 (Republican primary):
 Greg Laughlin (inc.) – 14,777 (42.52%)
 Ron Paul – 11,112 (31.97%)
 Jim Deats – 8,466 (24.36%)
 Ted Bozarth – 398 (1.15%)

Texas's 14th congressional district, 1996 (Republican primary runoff):
 Ron Paul – 11,244 (54.06%)
 Greg Laughlin (inc.) – 9,555 (45.94%)

Texas's 14th congressional district, 1996:
 Ron Paul (R) – 99,961 (51.08%)
 Charles Morris (D) – 93,200 (47.62%)
 Ed Fasanella (Natural Law) – 2,538 (1.30%)

Texas's 14th congressional district, 1998:
 Ron Paul (R) (inc.) – 84,459 (55.25%)
 Loy Sneary (D) – 68,014 (44.49%)
 Write-in – 390 (0.26%)

Texas's 14th congressional district, 2000:
 Ron Paul (R) (inc.) – 137,370 (59.71%)
 Loy Sneary (D) – 92,689 (40.29%)

Texas's 14th congressional district, 2002:
 Ron Paul (R) (inc.) – 102,905 (68.09%)
 Corby Windham (D) – 48,224 (31.91%)

Texas's 14th congressional district, 2004:
 Ron Paul (R) (inc.) – 173,668 (100.00%)

Texas's 14th congressional district, 2006 (Republican primary):
 Ron Paul (inc.) – 24,075 (77.65%)
 Cynthia Sinatra – 6,931 (22.35%)

Texas's 14th congressional district, 2006:
 Ron Paul (R) (inc.) – 94,380 (60.19%)
 Shane Sklar (D) – 62,429 (39.81%)

Texas's 14th congressional district, 2008 (Republican primary):
 Ron Paul (inc.) – 37,777 (70.43%)
 Chris Peden – 15,859 (29.56%)

Texas's 14th congressional district, 2008:
 Ron Paul (R) (inc.) – 191,293 (100.00%)

Texas's 14th congressional district, 2010
 Ron Paul (inc.) – 140,441 (76.0%)
 Robert Pruett – 44,345 (24.0%)

2008 presidential election
Iowa Republican straw poll, 2008:
 Mitt Romney – 4,516 (31.58%)
 Mike Huckabee – 2,587 (18.09%)
 Sam Brownback – 2,192 (15.33%)
 Tom Tancredo – 1,961 (13.71%)
 Ron Paul – 1,305 (9.13%)
 Tommy Thompson – 1,039 (7.27%)
 Fred Thompson – 203 (1.42%)
 Rudy Giuliani – 183 (1.28%)
 Duncan Hunter – 174 (1.22%)
 John McCain – 101 (0.71%)
 John Cox – 41 (0.29%)

Republican New Hampshire Vice Presidential primary, 2008:
 John Barnes, Jr. – 40,207 (62.43%)
 John McCain* – 4,305 (6.68%)
 Mike Huckabee* – 3,227 (5.01%)
 Rudy Giuliani* – 3,164 (4.91%)
 Mitt Romney* – 2,396 (3.72%)
 Ron Paul* – 1,938 (3.01%)
 Fred Thompson* – 1,496 (2.32%)
 Duncan Hunter* – 901 (1.40%)
 Others – 3,982 (6.18%)

(* – write in)

Liberty Union Party presidential primary, 2008:
 Brian Moore – 178 (44.61%)
 Barack Obama – 25 (6.27%)
 Hillary Clinton – 15 (3.76%)
 Ralph Nader – 5 (1.25%)
 Eugene V. Debs –  1 (0.25%)
 Patrick Leahy – 1 (0.25%)
 John McCain – 1 (0.25%)
 Richard Norford – 1 (0.25%)
 Ron Paul – 1 (0.25%)
 Morgan Phillips – 1 (0.25%)
 Others – 170 (42.61%)

Constitution Party presidential primaries, 2008:
 Don J. Grundmann – 16,105 (36.07%)
 Max Riekse – 13,597 (30.45%)
 Ron Paul – 65 (0.15%)
 David Andrew Larson – 18 (0.04%)
 Bryan Malatesta – 18 (0.04%)
 Undecided – 7 (0.02%)
 Mike Huckabee – 3 (0.01%)
 Alan Keyes – 3 (0.01%)
 Mitt Romney – 2 (0.00%)
 Jerome Corsi – 1 (0.00%)
 Others – 1 (0.00%)

Minnesota Independence Party presidential caucus, 2008:
 Mike Bloomberg – 50 (50.00%)
 Barack Obama – 20 (20.00%)
 Ron Paul – 20 (20.00%)
 Others – 10 (10.00%)

2008 Libertarian National Convention (Presidential tally):

First ballot:
 Bob Barr – 153
 Mary Ruwart – 152
 Wayne Allyn Root – 123
 Mike Gravel – 71
 George Phillies – 49
 Steve Kubby – 41
 Michael Jingozian – 23
 Ron Paul – 6
 Christine Smith – 6
 Penn Jillette – 3
 Daniel Imperato – 1
 William Koehler – 1
 None of the above – 2

Second ballot:
 'Bob Barr – 188
 Mary Ruwart – 162
 Wayne Allyn Root – 138
 Mike Gravel – 71
 George Phillies – 38
 Steve Kubby – 32
 Ron Paul – 3
 Stephen Colbert – 1
 Jesse Ventura – 1
 None of the above – 1

Third ballot:
 Bob Barr – 186
 Mary Ruwart – 186
 Wayne Allyn Root – 146
 Mike Gravel – 71
 George Phillies – 31
 Ron Paul – 1
 None of the above – 2

Sixth ballot:
 Bob Barr – 324
 Mary Ruwart – 276
 Ralph Nader – 1
 Ron Paul – 1
 None of the above – 26

Republican presidential primaries, 2008:
 John McCain – 9,926,234 (46.80%)
 Mitt Romney – 4,663,847 (21.99%)
 Mike Huckabee – 4,280,723 (20.18%)
 Ron Paul – 1,210,022 (5.71%)
 Rudy Giuliani – 597,494 (2.82%)
 Fred Thompson – 294,607 (1.39%)
 Uncommitted – 70,866 (0.33%)
 Alan Keyes – 59,637 (0.28%)
 Scattering – 42,822 (0.20%)
 Duncan Hunter – 39,895 (0.19%)
 Tom Tancredo – 8,595 (0.04%)
 John Cox – 3,351 (0.02%)
 Sam Brownback – 2,838 (0.01%)

2008 Republican National Convention (Presidential tally):
 John McCain – 2,343 (99.28%)
 Ron Paul – 15 (0.64%)
 Mitt Romney – 2 (0.09%)

2008 United States presidential election:
 Barack Obama/Joe Biden (D) – 69,498,215 (52.91%) and 365 electoral votes (28 states+D.C.+NE-02 carried)
 John McCain/Sarah Palin (R) – 59,948,240 (45.66%) and 173 electoral votes (22 states carried)
 Ralph Nader/Matt Gonzales (I) – 738,475 (0.56%)
 Bob Barr/Wayne Allyn Root (LBT) – 523,686 (0.40%)
 Chuck Baldwin/Darrell Castle (CST) – 199,314 (0.15%)
 Cynthia McKinney/Rosa Clemente (Green) – 161,603 (0.12%)
 Alan Keyes/Brian Rohrbough – 47,694 (0.04%)
 Ron Paul/With Multiple VP candidates – 42,426 (0.03%)
 Gloria La Riva/Eugene Puryear (Socialism & Liberation) – 6,808 (0.01%)
 Brian Moore/Stewart Alexander (Socialist) – 6,528 (0.01%)

2012 presidential election
Iowa Republican straw poll, 2011:
 Michele Bachmann - 4,823 (28.6%)
 Ron Paul - 4,671 (27.7%)
 Tim Pawlenty - 2,293 (13.6%)
 Rick Santorum - 1,657 (9.8%)
 Herman Cain - 1,456 (8.6%)
 Rick Perry (write-in) - 718 (4.3%)
 Mitt Romney - 567 (3.4%)
 Newt Gingrich - 385 (2.3%)
 Jon Huntsman - 69 (0.4%)
 Thaddeus McCotter - 35 (0.2%)
 Scattering - 218 (1.30%)

Republican New Hampshire Vice Presidential primary, 2012:
 Mitt Romney - 97,591 (39.27%)
 Ron Paul - 56,872 (22.88%)
 Jon Huntsman, Jr. - 41,964 (16.88%)
 Rick Santorum - 23,432 (9.43%)
 Newt Gingrich - 23,421 (9.42%)
 Rick Perry - 1,764 (.71%)
 Others - 3,171 (1.27%)
 Misc. write-ins - 260 (0.1%)

2012 Libertarian National Convention (Presidential tally):
 Gary Johnson - 419 (70.42%)
 R. Lee Wrights - 152 (25.55%)
 Jim Burns - 12 (2.02%)
 Carl Person - 3 (0.50%)
 NOTA - 3 (0.50%)
 Sam Sloan (Write-in) - 2 (0.34%)
 Max Abramson (Write-in) - 2 (0.34%)
 Ron Paul (Write-in) - 1 (0.17%)
 Wayne Allyn Root (Write-in) - 1 (0.17%)

Republican presidential primaries, 2012:
 Mitt Romney - 10,031,336 (52.13%)
 Rick Santorum - 3,932,069 (20.43%)
 Newt Gingrich - 2,734,571 (14.21%)
 Ron Paul - 2,095,762 (10.89%)
 Rick Perry - 54,769 (0.28%)  
 Jon Huntsman, Jr. - 83,918 (0.44%)
 Michele Bachmann - 41,199 (0.21%)

2012 Republican National Convention (Presidential tally):
 Mitt Romney – 2,061 (90.16%)
 Ron Paul – 185 (8.09%)
 Rick Santorum – 9 (0.39%)
 Jon Huntsman, Jr. - 1 (0.04%)
 Michele Bachmann - 1 (0.04%)
 Buddy Roemer - 1 (0.04%)
 Uncommitted  - 1 (0.04%)

2012 United States presidential election:
 Barack Obama/Joe Biden (D) - 65,915,796 (51.06%)
 Mitt Romney/Paul Ryan (R) - 60,933,500 (47.20%)
 Gary Johnson/James P. Gray (Libertarian) - 1,275,971 (0.99%)
 Jill Stein/Cheri Honkala (Green) - 469,627 (0.36%)
 Virgil Goode/Jim Clymer (Constitution) - 122,388 (0.09%)
 Roseanne Barr/Cindy Sheehan (Peace and Freedom) - 67,326 (0.05%)
 Rocky Anderson/Luis J. Rodriguez (Justice Party (United States)|Justice) - 43,018 (0.03%)
 Tom Hoefling/Jonathan D. Ellis (America's Party (political party)|America's) - 40,628	(0.03%)
 Ron Paul - 26,204 (0.02%)
 Others - 190,944 (0.15%)

2016 Presidential Election 
 Though not a candidate in the 2016 United States presidential election, Ron Paul received one vote in the electoral college. Paul also received a vote on the first ballot at the Libertarian Party National Convention's nomination for President.

See also
 Ron Paul presidential campaign, 1988
 Ron Paul presidential campaign, 2008
 Ron Paul presidential campaign, 2012

References

Ron Paul
Paul, Ron